Essington Lewis, CH (13 January 18812 October 1961) was a prominent Australian industrialist. He was the Director-General of the Department of Munitions during World War II.

Biography

Early life
Essington Lewis was born in Burra, South Australia on 13 January 1881. His father was the pastoralist and politician John Lewis (1844–1923), founder of Bagot, Shakes & Lewis. He was named after Port Essington, where his father owned a cattle property. He was educated at St Peter's College, Adelaide and the South Australian School of Mines.

Career
After joining BHP in 1904, he rose through the company ranks to become managing director in 1926 and chairman in 1950, a position he held until his death in 1961. For the whole of his period as M.D., he had a close working relationship and personal friendship with Chairman of Directors Harold Gordon Darling (1885–1950).

During his travels to Germany and Japan in the 1930s, he realised the threat of these countries to Australia. Accordingly, he helped establish the Commonwealth Aircraft Corporation and many munitions facilities meaning Australia was better prepared for industrialisation when the war started in 1939. During World War II, he also served as Director-General of the Department of Munitions. He supported the establishment of the motor industry in Australia in 1948, being rewarded by being able to purchase the first commercially produced Holden 48-215.

He was appointed a Member of the Order of the Companions of Honour on 24 September 1943 for his work as Director - Munitions & Aircraft Production in WW2.

Personal life
In 1910, he married Gladys Rosalind Cowan, OBE, the only daughter of James Cowan. Their family consisted of five children – sons James Essington Lewis and Robert Brook Lewis OAM, and daughters Helen Clarke, Mary Munckton OAM and Jane Nevile.  His sons were educated at Geelong Grammar School and the daughters at the Clyde School. Two children died in infancy - David and Janet. The family lived in Malvern, Victoria and owned a country property named "Landscape" near Tallarook in central Victoria.  Robert Brook (1918–2009) is notable as being the Master of St Mark's College, University of Adelaide from 1957 to 1968 and the Master of Menzies College, La Trobe University from 1968 to 1970.

Death
He died while riding his horse on his property "Landscape" near Tallarook on 2 October 1961, aged 80. Newspapers of the day claimed he suffered a heart attack. St John's Anglican Church, Toorak, was overflowing for his funeral; he was cremated.

Legacy

His life is the subject of several books, including The Steel-Master: a life of Essington Lewis by historian Geoffrey Blainey, another by Clive Turnbull and the musical play I am Work by John O'Donoghue. The Essington Lewis Memorial Lecture has been presented annually in South Australia since its establishment in 1975. It is funded by BHP and was instituted by the Adelaide Branch of the Australasian Institute of Mining and Metallurgy. One of Whyalla's main streets, Essington Lewis Avenue, was named in his honour.

Citations and references

Citations

References
.
.

Further reading and external links

 1971, Geoffrey Blainey, The Steel Master: Life of Essington Lewis, .
 Essington Lewis' Holden at the National Museum of Australia

1881 births
1961 deaths
Australian chief executives
Australian lacrosse players
Australian Members of the Order of the Companions of Honour
University of South Australia alumni
Australian public servants
Fellows of the Australian Academy of Science
People from Burra, South Australia
People educated at St Peter's College, Adelaide
BHP people